The Byssa is a river in Selemdzhinsky District, Amur Oblast, Russia. The name of the river originated in the Evenki language.

The river flows across a largely uninhabited area except for Byssa and Fevralsk villages in the area of its mouth. South of Fevralsk the river is crossed by the Far Eastern Railway line.

Course
The Byssa is a left tributary of the Selemdzha. The river flows in a roughly southwestern direction with rapids and a winding channel in its upper reaches. After leaving the mountainous area it enters a wide swampy valley where it meanders slowly all along its middle and lower course. Finally it meets the left bank of the Selemdzha  from its mouth in the Zeya. 

See also
List of rivers of Russia

References

External links 
река Бысса 2016
Быссинский источник - Amurvisit.ru

Rivers of Amur Oblast
Drainage basins of the Sea of Okhotsk